Guará is a Federal District Metro brazilian station on Orange and Green lines. It was opened on 10 May 2010 and added to the already operating section of the line, from Central to Terminal Samambaia and Terminal Ceilândia. It is located between Feira and Arniqueiras.

References

Brasília Metro stations
2009 establishments in Brazil
Railway stations opened in 2010